Nagapattinam Junction (station code: NGT) is a junction railway station serving the town of Nagapattinam in Tamil Nadu, India.

Jurisdiction
It belongs to the Tiruchirappalli railway division of the Southern Railway zone in Nagapattinam district in Tamil Nadu. The station code is NGT.

Location and layout
The railway station is located off the Nethaji Road, Tata Nagar, of Nagapattinam.

Lines
The station is connected via branch line to historic main line that connects Chennai with places like Tiruchirappalli Jn, Thanjavur Jn, Thiruvarur Jn, Rameswaram, etc. An additional line branches out north-bound to Karaikal via Nagore.

 BG Electrified single line towards Thanjavur junction
 BG Electrified single line towards 
 BG single line towards .

References

External links
 

Railway stations in Nagapattinam district
Trichy railway division
Railway junction stations in Tamil Nadu